Route 110 is a state highway in Connecticut running for  from US 1 in Stratford to Route 111 in Monroe.

In Shelton, Route 110 is designated the Veterans Memorial Highway.

Route description
Route 110 begins at an intersection with US 1 in Stratford and heads north along the west bank of the Housatonic River, intersecting Route 15 before continuing into Shelton.  In Shelton, it continues north along the Housatonic River, intersecting Route 8, then turns northwest through the center of town and west to Monroe.  In Monroe, Route 110 continues west to end at an intersection with Route 111.

History
The road from Monroe to Shelton was designated as State Highway 173 in 1922. South of Shelton, most of the  route following the west bank of the Housatonic River to Stratford was part of the original alignment of New England Route 8. The East Main Street portion in Stratford was Route 8A. Route 110 was commissioned in 1935, originally running from Route 111 in Monroe to Route 8 in Shelton. In 1952, Route 8 was moved west and the former section of Route 8, including the current Route 113, was reassigned to Route 110. Former Route 8A was renumbered to SR 708. In 1963, the section south of the current intersection with Route 113 was reassigned to Route 113 and the southernmost part of Route 110 was designated at its current route on East Main Street (former SR 708).

Major intersections

References

110
Stratford, Connecticut
Transportation in Fairfield County, Connecticut
Shelton, Connecticut
Monroe, Connecticut
1935 establishments in Connecticut